Monodonta gibbula is a species of sea snail, a marine gastropod mollusk in the family Trochidae, the top snails.

Distribution
This marine species occurs off the Agulhas Current,  South Africa.

References

External links
 To Encyclopedia of Life
 To World Register of Marine Species

Endemic fauna of South Africa
gibbula
Gastropods described in 1925